Deh Asgar castle is a historical castle located in Behabad County in Yazd Province, The longevity of this fortress dates back to the Qajar dynasty.

References 

Qajar castles

Castles in Iran